Dickinson is a city in Galveston County, Texas, within Houston–The Woodlands–Sugar Land metropolitan area. The population was 20,847 at the 2020 census.

History

Dickinson is located on a tract of land granted to John Dickinson in 1824, and named after him. A settlement had been established in this area on Dickinson Bayou before 1850. The Galveston, Houston, and Henderson Railroad was built directly through Dickinson. This line was used in the American Civil War to successfully retake Galveston.

The Dickinson Land and Improvement Association was organized in the 1890s by Fred M. Nichols and eight other businessmen. It marketed to potential farmers with claims of the soil's suitability for food crops, and to socialites with the creation of the Dickinson Picnic Grounds and other attractions. By 1911, the Galveston–Houston Electric Railway had three stops in Dickinson, and the Oleander Country Club was a popular destination for prominent Galvestonians.

In 1905, Italian ambassador Baron Mayor des Planches convinced about 150 Italians from crowded eastern cities to move to Dickinson. They joined the dozens relocated there after flooding in Bryan forced them to seek new homes.

During the 1920s, Dickinson became a significant tourist destination resulting from investment by the Maceo crime syndicate which ran Galveston during this time. The syndicate created gambling venues in the city such as the Silver Moon casino.
 
The City of Dickinson constructed a new multimillion-dollar city hall and library complex which was dedicated June 30, 2009. The complex is located at 4403 Highway 3.

In May 2009 the city began hosting a crawfish festival, called the Red, White and Bayou crawfish festival. The city decided in 2018 not to continue with the festival. In August of 2022 the city resumed the festival.

In August 2017, Dickinson was devastated by Hurricane Harvey. Ninety percent of the city was flooded during the storm and 50% was destroyed by flooding.

In January of 2021, Dickinson made national news by the Mayoral election run-off ending in a tie (1,010 votes to 1010 votes), Mayor Sean Skipworth was selected by drawing a name out of a hat.

In August of 2021, Dickinson made national news again when Council Member Position 1, H. Scott Apley died of the COVID-19 virus after making many anti-mask, anti-vaccine, social media posts. Johnnie Simpson Jr., a United Methodist Pastor, won the seat after earning 49% of the vote in a four-way special elction, and 60.3% of the vote in a runoff.

Geography

Dickinson is located at  (29.460467, –95.053856).

Demographics

2020 census

As of the 2020 United States census, there were 20,847 people, 7,892 households, and 5,545 families residing in the city.

2000 census
As of the census of 2000, there were 17,093 people, 6,162 households, and 4,522 families residing in the city. The population density was 1,770.7 people per square mile (683.9/km2). There were 6,556 housing units at an average density of 679.1 per square mile (262.3/km2). The racial makeup of the city was 75.35% White, 10.52% African American, 0.64% Native American, 1.21% Asian, 0.04% Pacific Islander, 12.82% from other races, and 2.43% from two or more races. Hispanic or Latino of any race were 24.90% of the population.

There were 6,162 households, out of which 36.6% had children under the age of 18 living with them, 55.4% were married couples living together, 13.0% had a female householder with no husband present, and 26.6% were non-families. 21.6% of all households were made up of individuals, and 6.6% had someone living alone who was 65 years of age or older. The average household size was 2.76 and the average family size was 3.22.

In the city, the population was spread out, with 28.5% under the age of 18, 9.6% from 18 to 24, 30.5% from 25 to 44, 21.8% from 45 to 64, and 9.6% who were 65 years of age or older. The median age was 34 years. For every 100 females, there were 99.7 males. For every 100 females age 18 and over, there were 98.2 males.

The median income for a household in the city was $41,984, and the median income for a family was $46,585. Males had a median income of $36,391 versus $26,943 for females. The per capita income for the city was $19,785. About 9.5% of families and 13.1% of the population were below the poverty line, including 17.6% of those under age 18 and 7.2% of those age 65 or over.

Government and infrastructure
The Dickinson City Hall is located at 4403 Highway 3 and the Dickinson Public Library is located at 4411 Highway 3. The Dickinson Police Department is located at 4000 Liggio Street. There are fire stations at 4500 FM 517 East, which also houses EMS, and 221 FM 517 West. The fire department is run by Volunteers. The Dickinson Post Office is located at 2515 Termini Street.

Education

Public schools

Most of Dickinson is a part of the Dickinson Independent School District. Some of it is a part of the Santa Fe Independent School District.

The following schools serve the Dickinson ISD portion:
 Elementary schools
Calder Road Elementary School (Pre-K–4th Grade)
 Bay Colony Elementary School (Pre-K–4th Grade)
 Hughes Road Elementary School (Pre-K–4th Grade)
 Jake Sibernagel Elementary School (Pre-K–4th Grade)
 K. E. Little Elementary School (Pre-K–4th Grade) [serves Bacliff portion of DISD]
 San Leon Elementary School (Pre-K–4th Grade) [serves San Leon portion of DISD]
 Louis G. Lobit Elementary School (Pre-K–4th Grade)
 Middle schools
 John and Shamarion Barber Middle School (5th–6th Grade)
 Dunbar Middle School (5th–6th Grade)
 Elva C. Lobit Middle School (5th–6th Grade) 
 Junior high schools
 R.D. McAdams Junior High School (7th–8th Grade)
 Eugene Kranz Junior High School
 Dickinson Junior High School (BUILDING)
 High schools
 Dickinson High School (9th–12th Grade)

Before the 2004–2005 school year, all DISD elementary schools provided education for Pre-K through 5th grades. But Barber Elementary School was turned into a Middle School center for 5th grade from the 2004/05 school year to the 2007/08 school year. For the 2008/09 school year and beyond, a newly built Barber Middle School built off FM 517 and Dunbar Middle School (which recently only held the 6th grade) will now both hold 5th–6th grades. Students will be separated into schools based on where they reside. A new R.D. McAdams Junior High School has been built on Hughes Road.

Bay Area Charter Middle School is a state charter school in Dickinson.

Private schools
True Cross School, a Roman Catholic pre-K–8 school operated by the Roman Catholic Archdiocese of Galveston-Houston, is in Dickinson. True Cross School was the first Roman Catholic school on the Galveston County mainland. The school was unusable due to Hurricane Harvey. The students attended classes at Our Lady of Fatima in Texas City, Texas. The school reopened for the 2019–2020 school year.

Queen of Angels Academy, a school of the Society of St. Pius X, is located at the original Holy Cross location, and provides a classical Catholic education. Queen of Angels parish also has the traditional Latin Mass daily. Although the church structure was built in 1947, the interior has been renovated to reflect their attachment to Catholic tradition. The sanctuary, containing the main altar, has been praised for its beauty by many visitors.

Colleges and universities
Dickinson is served by the College of the Mainland, a community college in Texas City.

Public libraries
Dickinson Public Library, operated by the city, is located at 4411 Highway 3.

Parks and recreation
The Galveston County Department of Parks and Senior Services operates the Dickinson Community Center at 2714 Highway 3.

Dickinson Bayou is a bayou that flows in and out of the city of Dickinson. 

Parks are numerous around the city. Paul Hopkins Park on 517 is host to the Festival of Lights each December. Elva Lobit Park and Zempter Park are parks that host the city's youth baseball leagues. A state-maintained boat dock is present at the Highway 3 and 146 bridges.

Notable people
 Bill Gurley, venture capitalist originally from Dickinson
 Gene Kranz, NASA Flight Director during the Gemini and Apollo programs
 Donnie Little, former American football quarterback and the first black quarterback to play for The University of Texas
 James Oberg, American and Russian space expert
 Tracy Scoggins, Hollywood actress
 Craig Veasey, (University of Houston, defensive end), former professional football player (defensive tackle), Pittsburgh Steelers, Miami Dolphins, Houston Oilers
 Andre Ware, 1989 Heisman Trophy winner (University of Houston, quarterback) and former professional football player

References

External links
 City of Dickinson official website
 

Cities in Texas
Cities in Galveston County, Texas
Greater Houston
Galveston Bay Area